Beth Nugent (born c. 1958) is an American writer and academic.

She received her BA from Connecticut College in 1978, and her MFA from the University of Iowa in 1982.

Nugent has published two books:  City of Boys (1992), a collection of short stories, and Live Girls (1996), a novel.

Since 1998, she has been an associate professor in the writing program at the School of the Art Institute of Chicago.

References 

1958 births
Living people
20th-century American novelists
American women novelists
American women short story writers
20th-century American women writers
20th-century American short story writers
21st-century American women